The Serra dos Reis A State Park is a state park in the state of Rondônia, Brazil.

Location

The Serra dos Reis A State Park is divided between the municipalities of Costa Marques (14.17%) and São Francisco do Guaporé (85.83%) in Rondônia.
It adjoins the Serra dos Reis State Park along its southern boundary.
The park is to the south of the BR-429 highway, east of the town of Costa Marques and north of the Guaporé River, which defines the border with Bolivia.

History

The park was bounded by the Serra dos Reis State Park, created by decree 7.027 of 8 August 1995.
The State Department of Environmental Development (SEDAM) was made responsible for administration.

Notes

Sources

State parks of Brazil
Protected areas established in 1996
1996 establishments in Brazil
Protected areas of Rondônia